The 2020 GT World Challenge Europe Endurance Cup was the tenth season of the GT World Challenge Europe Endurance Cup and the first after title sponsor Blancpain withdrew support.

Calendar
The season began on 19 July at Imola and ended on 15 November at Paul Ricard. The season featured four rounds, with one race lasting for a duration of three hours, the Circuit Paul Ricard 1000 km, the 6 Hours of Nürburgring lasting for a duration of six hours and the 24 Hours of Spa events.

Entry List

Race results
Bold indicates the overall winner.

Championship standings
Scoring system
Championship points are awarded for the first ten positions in each race. The pole-sitter also receives one point and entries are required to complete 75% of the winning car's race distance in order to be classified and earn points. Individual drivers are required to participate for a minimum of 25 minutes in order to earn championship points in any race.

Imola points

Nürburgring & Paul Ricard points

24 Hours of Spa points
Points are awarded after six hours, after twelve hours and at the finish.

Drivers' championships

Overall

Notes

Silver Cup

Pro-Am Cup

Am Cup

Team's championships

Overall

Notes

Silver Cup

Pro-Am Cup

Am Cup

Notes

See also
2020 GT World Challenge Europe
2020 GT World Challenge Europe Sprint Cup
2020 GT World Challenge Asia
2020 GT World Challenge America
2020 Intercontinental GT Challenge

Notes

References

External links

Endurance Cup|
GT World Challenge Europe Endurance Cup